The Panasonic Lumix DMC-FZ2500 (also known as the Panasonic Lumix DMC-FZ2000) is a 1" sensor DSLR-styled digital bridge camera released by Panasonic on November 28, 2016. It succeeded the Panasonic Lumix DMC-FZ1000, however the FZ1000 II was released in March, 2019 also. Its main competing model is the Sony RX10 III.

The FZ2500 offers several improvements over its predecessor, including a touch screen, headphone jack, Cinema 4K (24 fps only), a longer zoom, internal ND filters, unlimited 4K Recording, 4K image stabilization, a side loaded SD Card slot, and a Pull Focus function. Regarding its lens, compared to that of the FZ1000 it has 9 blades instead of 7, as well as an additional element.
However, its first release was $400 more expensive than that of the FZ1000.

In their review of the FZ2500, DPReview wrote, "The Panasonic DMC-FZ2500/FZ2000 is a well-designed, full-featured enthusiast bridge camera that's hard to ignore. While it's clearly targeted toward video shooting, at which it's excellent, it is also a very good (but not best-in-class) stills camera.", and gave it its Silver Award.

References

External links
https://www.dpreview.com/reviews/panasonic-lumix-dmc-fz2500-fz2000
https://www.imaging-resource.com/PRODS/panasonic-fz2500/panasonic-fz2500A.HTM
https://smartliving.tv/panasonic-fz2500-price-specs-release-date-pros-cons-video/
https://www.pcmag.com/reviews/panasonic-lumix-dmc-fz2500
https://help.panasonic.ca/PCS/OperatingInstructions/DMC-FZ2500%20Basic%20OI%20Eng.pdf

Bridge digital cameras
FZ2500
Superzoom cameras
Audiovisual introductions in 2016
Digital cameras with CMOS image sensor